Off Pitch was an American reality documentary television series that debuted on VH1 on April 17, 2013. The series chronicles the Grand River Singers, a Glee-inspired adult community show choir located in La Crosse, Wisconsin.

Cast

 Rob (age 43) – co-director and choreographer
 Tim (age 43) – co-founder and musical director
 Scott (age 26) – stage manager
 Greg (age 20)
 Marcia (age 24)
 Josh (age 27)
 Aubrey (age 28)
 Liv (age 20)
 Vanessa (age 20)
 Molly K. (age 21)
 Molly J. (age 23)
 Kayla (age 21)
 Nick (age 22)
 Jon (age 20)
 Drew (age 31)
 Malachi (age 23)
 Erin (age 33)
 Justin (age 21)
 Eric (age 22)
 Steven (age 24)
 Samantha (age 22)

Episodes

Season 1 (2013)

References

External links

2010s American reality television series
2013 American television series debuts
2013 American television series endings
English-language television shows
La Crosse, Wisconsin
Television shows set in Wisconsin
VH1 original programming
Show choirs